Roderick William Cameron (1913 – 18 September 1985) was an American travel writer. He wrote a number of travel books and also contributed to Life and Horizon magazines. For several years he was contributing editor of L'Oeil.

Early life
Cameron was born in 1913, the son of Roderick M. Cameron who married an Australian, Enid Lindemann, who, through a later marriage to Valentine Browne, 6th Earl of Kenmare, became Countess of Kenmare in Ireland. His grandfather was Roderick Cameron, shipping magnate who founded R. W. Cameron & Company in New York.

He was educated at private schools in England and Switzerland, and later at the Courtauld Institute of Art.

Career
He worked for the Office of Strategic Services during World War II and spent much time in London.

He had no need to work, having inherited wealth, but produced a number of travel books and works of  history. He also contributed to Life and Horizon magazines and for several years was contributing editor of L'Oeil. Apart from writing, his principal interest was interior design.

Personal life
Cameron was bisexual and had relationships with men and women. He never married and had no children.

Death
Cameron died of AIDS-related illnesses at his home in Menerbes, France, on 18 September 1985. He was survived by a half-brother, Lord Waterpark of London, and a half-sister, Patricia O'Neill of Cape Province, South Africa.

Selected publications
 My travel's history. Hamish Hamilton, London, 1950.
 Equator farm: An account of the author's visits to Kenya, Uganda and Zanzibar. William Heinemann, London, 1955.
 Shadows from India. An architectural album &c. William Heinemann, London, 1958.
 Time of the mango flowers. Heinemann, London, 1958.
 Shells. Weidenfeld & Nicolson, London, 1961.
 The golden haze: With Captain Cook in the South Pacific. Weidenfeld & Nicolson, London, 1964.
 Viceroyalties of the west: The Spanish Empire in Latin America. Weidenfeld & Nicolson, London, 1968. 
 Australia: History and horizons. Weidenfeld and Nicolson, London, 1971. 
 The golden Riviera. Weidenfeld and Nicolson, London, 1975.

See also
 Van Day Truex, Cameron's close friend.

References

External links
 http://ourhousejds.blogspot.co.uk/2011/02/roderick-rory-cameron.html

American travel writers
American magazine editors
AIDS-related deaths in France
Bisexual men
American interior designers
1913 births
1985 deaths
20th-century American LGBT people
American bisexual writers